Light in the Dark is the second album of the American rock supergroup Revolution Saints.

The album was produced by Italian Alessandro Del Vecchio, involved on songwriting, on keyboards and backing vocals also.

The Light in the Dark Deluxe Edition has 4 bonus live tracks recorded in Milan at Frontiers Rock Festival on April 29, 2017.

The title track was the first single that came out on July 21.

Track listing

Personnel
 Deen Castronovo – drums, lead & backing vocals
 Jack Blades – bass guitar, backing vocals
 Doug Aldrich – guitars

Additional personnel
 Alessandro Del Vecchio – keyboards, backing vocals, production, mixing, mastering, live keyboards and backing vocals
 Serafino Perugino – executive producer
 Steve Toomey – Live Drums

References

2017 albums
Frontiers Records albums
Revolution Saints albums